Sulia Jatra is celebrated in the village of Khairguda, situated in Balangir district, Western Odisha.  It is widely reported that thousands of animals and birds are sacrificed during this festival which takes place on the second Tuesday of the month of Pausha.

Origin
Sulia Jatra is named after the god Sulia of tribal communities.  The place is surrounded with nature.  The animal sacrifice is a long tradition of the Kandha tribes.  They believe that it will bring success and prosperity to the community by offering blood to the Sulia god.  It was also reported that eight sub castes of the Kandha worship Sulia as their presiding deity in this 500-year-old tradition.

Media coverage
The Sulia Jatra has received media coverage, including:

References

External links
 Tradition splashed tribal festival with animal blood
 Sulia Jatra
 Tribals sacrifice hundreds of animals in Orissa

 Sulia jatra history

Balangir district
Festivals in Odisha